Edoardo Reja (born 10 October 1945) is an Italian professional football manager and former player who is the manager of Slovenian club Gorica.

After a career as a midfielder spent mostly with SPAL and Palermo, he began working as a manager. He won four promotions from Serie B, including as champions with Brescia (1997) and Vicenza (2000), as well as Cagliari (2004) and Napoli (2007).

Reja managed Vicenza, Napoli, Lazio and Atalanta in Serie A.

Playing career
Reja began his career with the SPAL 1907 youth squad, coached by Paolo Mazza, playing in midfield alongside lifelong friend Fabio Capello, and other notable players such as Louis Pasetti and Adriano Zanier. Together, they helped the team win the 1963–64 Campionato Nazionale Primavera. In 1965, Reja joined Capello in Serie A, in the SPAL 1907 first team, earning an appearance with the Italian U-23 squad. Reja played for two more teams, U.S. Città di Palermo and Alessandria in a long career that lasted until 1975, playing a total of 124 Serie A matches.

Coaching career

Early career
Reja started his coaching career in 1979 serving as boss of Serie D team Molinella. Next year he then coached Monselice of Serie C2. In 1989, he coached his first Serie B team, Pescara, of which he was previously the youth squad boss. He successively gained good successes in the same league with Cosenza, Lecce and Brescia, where he won the championship. In fact, he launched the career of notable footballer Andrea Pirlo at Brescia, where Pirlo was a regular member of the squad. However, Reja opted to give up the opportunity to coach Brescia in Serie A, preferring to accept an offer from Torino, another Serie B team, where he then missed promotion defeated in the promotion playoffs to Perugia after a penalty shootout.

Serie A debut at Vicenza, Genoa, Catania and Cagliari
During the 1998–1999 season, he was appointed coach of Serie A club Vicenza, thus making his debut in a top division team, but was unable to save the team from relegation. Next year he remained at Vicenza and led his team back to Serie A, but promptly relegated one more time in 2001. In 2001–2002, he replaced Franco Scoglio at the helm of Genoa (Serie B), but to be fired himself only three months later. On 2002–2003, he was appointed in the mid-season by Catania boss Luciano Gaucci to replace John Toshack. In November 2003, he replaced Gian Piero Ventura at Cagliari and guided the rossoblu to second place in the Serie B and promotion to Serie A, but was not confirmed.

Napoli
In January 2005, Reja was appointed as the manager of Napoli, again after Ventura's dismissal. He led Napoli to win Serie C1, obtaining promotion to Serie B in 2006, then a second consecutive promotion to Serie A in 2007 – returning the Naples team to the top flight for the first time since 2001.

In his first Serie A campaign with Napoli, Reja guided them to an Intertoto Cup qualification spot, and was confirmed at the helm of Napoli in the 2008–09 Serie A season. He managed to lead the Partenopei to the second qualification round of the UEFA Cup, where they were defeated by S.L. Benfica. Napoli rose up to first place in the Serie A table in the first half of the season. After two points in nine games caused the team to fall into the bottom half, Reja was sacked on 10 March 2009, following a 0–2 home loss to Lazio, and replaced by former Italian team boss Roberto Donadoni.

Lazio
After a short successful spell as head coach of Croatian side Hajduk Split from August 2009 to February 2010, Reja opted to quit his job in Split in order to become the new manager of S.S. Lazio. He was unveiled as the new Lazio head coach the following day, replacing Davide Ballardini. He turned the fortunes of a club in dismay, guiding it out of the relegation zone and into a mid-table finish in the season.

The 2010–11 season for Lazio started in an astonishing way, with the team surprisingly heading Serie A with a four-point advantage to runners-up Inter after nine games, thanks to Reja's abilities in relaunching players such as Mauro Zárate, Cristian Ledesma and Stefano Mauri, as well as introducing new key signings such as Brazilian international Hernanes. On 17 May 2012 he resigned from the job, despite the president's pleas for him to stay on.

After the sacking of Vladimir Petković, Reja returned to Lazio for a second spell on 4 January 2014, completing the season in ninth place. On 12 June 2014, he resigned from his role, with Stefano Pioli appointed as his replacement the same day.

Atalanta
Reja was appointed trainer of Atalanta on 4 March 2015 with the team three points above the relegation zone after the dismissal of Stefano Colantuono. His time at the club ended in May 2016, having saved them twice from relegation.

Albania
On 17 April 2019, Albania signed Reja to a seven-month contract after fellow Italian Christian Panucci was dismissed the previous month.

He made a huge contribution to the Albania national team giving the chance to many young players.

Personal life
Reja was born in the village of Lucinico, now a suburb of Gorizia, near the border between Italy and Slovenia. His father was a Slovenian from the village of Vipolže in Brda, Slovenia, while his mother was Friulian. He is fluent in Italian, Slovenian, and Friulan. However, his levels of fluency vary: while he is able to speak the standard form of Italian, he only speaks a regional variety of Slovenian, strongly influenced by his native Brda dialect.

He is close friends with Fabio Capello. Reja has been married to his wife Livia since 1969; he met his wife while rooming with Capello in Ferrara, at the time playing for SPAL 1907.

Managerial statistics

Honours

Player
SPAL 1907
Campionato Nazionale Primavera: 1964–65

U.S. Alessandria Calcio 1912
Serie C1: 1973–74

Manager
Brescia
Serie B: 1996–97

Vicenza
Serie B: 1999–2000

Napoli
Serie C1: 2005–06

References

1945 births
Living people
People from Gorizia
Footballers from Friuli Venezia Giulia
Italian Slovenes
Italian people of Slovene descent
Italian footballers
Association football midfielders
Serie A players
Serie B players
S.P.A.L. players
Palermo F.C. players
U.S. Alessandria Calcio 1912 players
Benevento Calcio players
Italian football managers
Serie B managers
Serie A managers
Croatian Football League managers
A.S. Pro Gorizia managers
Treviso F.B.C. 1993 managers
Delfino Pescara 1936 managers
Hellas Verona F.C. managers
Bologna F.C. 1909 managers
U.S. Lecce managers
Brescia Calcio managers
Torino F.C. managers
L.R. Vicenza managers
Genoa C.F.C. managers
Catania S.S.D. managers
Cagliari Calcio managers
S.S.C. Napoli managers
HNK Hajduk Split managers
S.S. Lazio managers
Atalanta B.C. managers
Albania national football team managers
ND Gorica managers
Italian expatriate football managers
Expatriate football managers in Croatia
Italian expatriate sportspeople in Croatia
Expatriate football managers in Albania
Italian expatriate sportspeople in Albania
Expatriate football managers in Slovenia
Italian expatriate sportspeople in Slovenia